Cistercian Preparatory School is a private school for young men located in Irving, Texas, in the Roman Catholic Diocese of Dallas. Serving grades five through twelve (though previously having a 4th grade pre-form), the school has an enrollment of about 350. Each grade is assigned a priest or a dedicated teacher as a "Form Master," who follows the class over the years and is responsible for building a feeling of community.

History 

Cistercian was founded by a group of monks from Hungary's Zirc Abbey, who had fled Hungary from ongoing Soviet pressure following WWII. In 1948, Cistercian secondary schools in Hungary had been closed, and in 1950, their monasteries had been confiscated. Zirc monks began immigrating, with many of them ending up in Dallas, where they created a new abbey and found leadership and teaching roles at the University of Dallas. Cistercian monks had been involved in secondary education in Europe since the 18th century, and by 1962, they founded the Cistercian School in Dallas. Among the early teachers at cistercian was Fr. Bede Lackner.

Current Program

Throughout their 8 years, the boys follow a pre-set all honors curriculum, with a focus on a holistic education, while maintaining a focus both towards writing and STEM. Middle schoolers take Latin, while high schoolers choose between French and Spanish and may elect additional courses in Latin or German.

The graduating class of 2021 had 46 students, and there were 355 total students in grades 5-12. The curriculum is single track and consists of all honors courses, but no AP classes. While community service is not required, the typical class averages 8000 hours of volunteer contributions. All graduates attend 4-year colleges. In 2021, 19% of the students received financial assistance. Of the 53 faculty members, 30% are Cistercian monks and 85% have graduate degrees.

Cistercian's academic program has been highly rated, both regionally and nationally, for many years. For example, Cistercian was ranked among the 50 “Smartest Private High Schools in the United States” by one independent group and, in 2021, was named the 3rd best Catholic high school in the country.

Athletics 
Students are encouraged to participate in sports in every season. Cistercian fields teams in eight varsity sports in three athletic seasons: football and cross country (fall); basketball, soccer, and swimming (winter); baseball, track & field, and tennis (spring). The school is a member of the Southwest Preparatory Conference, which hosts championship tournaments and meets at the end of every season. The school's mascot is the hawk. Its colors are black and white.

Notable alumni

Will Ford Hartnett (1974), former member of the Texas House of Representatives (1993–2013)
Geoff Marslett (1992), independent filmmaker and professor
Andrés Ruzo (2005), geoscientist, conservationist, author, science communicator and educator, who studied the Boiling River of the Amazon
Ryan Sitton (1993), member of the Texas Railroad Commission (2015–2021)

Notable faculty
 Fr. Bede Lackner, theologian and historian
 Fr. Denis Farkasfalvy, Abbot of Our Lady of Dallas Abbey from 1988 to 2012, theologian, and historian; Headmaster of Cistercian from 1969 to 1981 and longtime math teacher at the school

References

External links

 

Irving, Texas
Independent Schools Association of the Southwest
Catholic secondary schools in Texas
Educational institutions established in 1962
Boys' schools in Texas
Private high schools in Dallas County, Texas
1962 establishments in Texas